Pavel Simr (born 6 July 1983) is a Czech footballer, who plays as a forward. He currently plays for FC Velké Meziříčí, on loan from Jihlava.

External links
 

1983 births
Living people
Footballers from Brno
Czech footballers
Czech First League players
FC Zbrojovka Brno players
FC Vysočina Jihlava players
FK Mladá Boleslav players
Slovak Super Liga players
FC Nitra players
Association football forwards